Zinc transporter 3 also known as solute carrier family 30 member 3 is a protein in humans that is encoded by the SLC30A3 gene.

The SLC30A3 gene codes for the ZnT-3 SLC30A family membrane transport protein. ZnT-3 is required for the accumulation of zinc ions inside synaptic vesicles. In mice, ZnT-3 is required for some forms of memory that depend on the hippocampus and the amygdala. Zinc transport by ZnT-3 modulates memory formation by acting through the extracellular signal-regulated kinases signaling pathway. Angiotensin II-induced  senescence of vascular smooth muscle cells requires down-regulation of ZnT-3 and ZnT-10.

See also 
 Solute carrier family

References 

Solute carrier family